Juan Ignacio Marcarié Carrá (born 25 September 1985, in Buenos Aires) is an Argentine footballer who currently plays for Ecuadorian side SD Aucas as an attacking midfielder.

After playing abroad in Venezuela and Uruguay, Marcarie moved to Ecuador, where he would make his competitive debut for Mushuc Runa in 2014. In 2016, Marcarie cancelled his contract with Ecuadorian side Fuerza Amarilla after a strong earthquake and returned to his native Argentina.

Teams
  Tristán Suárez 2005-2006
  Berazategui 2006-2007
  Ituzaingó 2007-2008
  Colegiales 2008-2009
  Berazategui 2009
  San Miguel 2010
  Estudiantes de Mérida 2010
  Tristán Suárez 2011
  Atlético Venezuela 2011-2012
  Club Atlético N. de la Riestra 2012
  El Tanque Sisley 2012-2014
  Mushuc Runa 2014
  SD Aucas 2015
  Fuerza Amarilla 2016-

References

External links
 
 

1985 births
Living people
Argentine footballers
Argentine expatriate footballers
CSyD Tristán Suárez footballers
Estudiantes de Mérida players
Atlético Venezuela C.F. players
El Tanque Sisley players
Expatriate footballers in Uruguay
Expatriate footballers in Venezuela
Expatriate footballers in Ecuador
Argentine expatriate sportspeople in Uruguay
Argentine expatriate sportspeople in Venezuela
Argentine expatriate sportspeople in Ecuador
Association football midfielders
Footballers from Buenos Aires